The third season of the original Mission: Impossible originally aired Sundays at 10:00–11:00 pm (EST) on CBS from September 29, 1968 to April 20, 1969.

Cast

Episodes

References

3
1968 American television seasons
1969 American television seasons